Sasha Alexander Aneff Medrano Rosso (born 26 June 1991 in Montevideo) is a former Uruguayan footballer.

Youth career
Sasha is a product of four times Uruguayan Primera División champions Defensor Sporting. He has represented the club in various age group before making his senior team debut in 2010.

Club career
Aneff started his career playing for Defensor Sporting. He made his professional debut on 6 October 2010 against C.A. Cerro.

In 2012, he was loaned out to Bulgarian side Botev Vratsa.

On 25 November 2013, he signed a new contract with Slovenian PrvaLiga side NK Domžale.

On 17 February 2015, he signed a six-month loan with Croatian side NK Osijek.

On 31 March 2016 it was announced that Sasha has signed for Superettan side Syrianska FC. After only 4 league games the club terminated his contracted on 30 May 2016.

On 24 June 2016 it was announced that he has signed for NorthEast United in the Indian Super League. On his signing head coach Sergio Farias told,"Sasha is strong,good in the air and is always on hand to pounce in the box.It is important for the squad to have a balanced mix and he definitely has the attributes we are looking for."

International career
He has been capped by the Uruguay national under-20 football team for the Suwon Cup.

Personal life
He is of Bulgarian descent as his grandfather and grandmother were born in Bulgaria, and married after they met in Montevideo. His family also has Argentinian origins through his maternal family. He also holds a Bulgarian passport.

Honours

Club
Defensor Sporting
Uruguayan Primera División: Runner-up (2): 2010–11, 2012–13

References

External links
PrvaLiga profile 

1991 births
Living people
Footballers from Montevideo
Uruguayan people of Bulgarian descent
Uruguayan footballers
Uruguay under-20 international footballers
Association football forwards
Defensor Sporting players
Racing Club de Montevideo players
Uruguayan expatriate footballers
Uruguayan expatriate sportspeople in Croatia
Uruguayan expatriate sportspeople in Slovenia
Uruguayan expatriate sportspeople in Bulgaria
Uruguayan expatriate sportspeople in India
Expatriate footballers in Bulgaria
First Professional Football League (Bulgaria) players
FC Botev Vratsa players
Expatriate footballers in Slovenia
NK Domžale players
Slovenian PrvaLiga players
Croatian Football League players
NK Osijek players
Expatriate footballers in Croatia